Timothy Martin Cain (born January 19, 1961) is a United States district judge of the United States District Court for the District of South Carolina. He was formerly a South Carolina state judge and a law associate of Senator Lindsey Graham.

Early life and education 

Born in Seneca, South Carolina, Cain attended Anderson College in 1979 and 1980 and earned a Bachelor of Science degree in 1983 from the University of South Carolina. He then earned a Juris Doctor in 1986 from the University of South Carolina School of Law.

Professional career 

After graduating from law school, Cain worked in private legal practice in Walhalla, South Carolina from 1986 until 1988 (including a stint in 1987 as a public defender in Seneca, South Carolina), and then as an assistant county solicitor in Seneca from 1988 until 1989. He then worked as an associate for a Seneca law firm from 1990 until 1991. Cain then worked as a partner in differently comprised firms in Seneca from 1991 until 1993, 1993 until 1996. 1996 until 1998 and 1998 until 2000. During Cain's time in private practice, he worked alongside future United States Senator Lindsey Graham for about three years. Cain also served as county attorney for Oconee County, South Carolina from 1992 until 2000. In 2000, Cain became a family court judge in Columbia, South Carolina.

Federal judicial service 

On February 16, 2011, President Obama nominated Cain to a seat on the United States District Court for the District of South Carolina that had been vacated by the decision of Judge Patrick Michael Duffy to take senior status in 2009. The Senate confirmed Cain on September 20, 2011 in a 99–0 vote. He received his commission on September 26, 2011.

References

External links

1961 births
Living people
Judges of the United States District Court for the District of South Carolina
People from Seneca, South Carolina
Public defenders
South Carolina state court judges
United States district court judges appointed by Barack Obama
21st-century American judges
University of South Carolina School of Law alumni